Dolichomyia is a genus of bee flies in the family Bombyliidae. There are about seven described species in Dolichomyia.

Species
These seven species belong to the genus Dolichomyia:
 Dolichomyia chilensis (Philippi, 1865) c g
 Dolichomyia coniocera Hall, 1976 c g
 Dolichomyia detecta Schiner, 1868 c g
 Dolichomyia gracilis Williston, 1894 i c g b
 Dolichomyia nigra Wiedemann, 1830 c g
 Dolichomyia nigria Wiedemann, 1830 c g
 Dolichomyia stenopennis Hall, 1976 c g
Data sources: i = ITIS, c = Catalogue of Life, g = GBIF, b = Bugguide.net

References

Further reading

 

Bombyliidae
Articles created by Qbugbot
Bombyliidae genera